This list of sports journalism awards is an index to articles that describe notable awards for sports journalism, including both broadcast and print media. It also includes books about sports.

List

See also

Lists of awards
List of journalism awards
List of sport awards

References

 
 
journalism
Sports